The molecular formula  (molar mass: 307.48 g/mol, exact mass: 307.2511 u) may refer to:

 Dysidazirine
 Fingolimod